Protest camps are physical camps that are set up by activists, to either provide a base for protest, or to delay, obstruct or prevent the focus of their protest by physically blocking it with the camp. Protest camps may also have a symbolic or reproductive component where 'protest campers' try and recreate their desired worlds through the enactment of protest camp infrastructures (such as communal kitchens, child care, environmentally friendly composting toilet or use of grey water systems) or through the modes of organising and governance (e.g. direct democracy).

Camping on and/or occupying land has a long history which can be traced back to nomadic cultures as well as the 17th century Diggers. However, the use of protest camps as a contemporary form of protest can be linked back to the US civil rights movement of the 1960s and, specifically, "Resurrection City", a protest camp held in May 1968 in Washington, D.C. as part of the Poor People's Campaign. In the United Kingdom publicity around the 1982 Greenham Common Women's Peace Camp in England put protest camps in the public imagination. Since then the practice of protest camping has and continues to be used by many social movements around the world.

See also
 Camp for Climate Action
 Camp Stupid
 Gdeim Izik protest camp
 Occupation (protest)
 Occupy movement
 Peace camp
 Poor People's Campaign
 Rossport Solidarity Camp

References

External links
Protest Camps research project